The third season of Saturday Night Live, an American sketch comedy series, originally aired in the United States on NBC between September 24, 1977, and May 20, 1978.

The DVD set of the entire season was released on May 13, 2008.

Cast
Prior to the start of the season, two new cast members were added as featured cast members which were writers Tom Davis and Al Franken. Meanwhile Dan Aykroyd joined Jane Curtin as an anchor for Weekend Update becoming the first Weekend Update anchor team. This would be the final season that the cast was called "The Not Ready for Primetime Players".

Cast

The Not Ready for Prime Time Players
Dan Aykroyd
John Belushi
Jane Curtin
Garrett Morris
Bill Murray
Laraine Newman
Gilda Radner

Featured players
Tom Davis
Al Franken

bold denotes Weekend Update anchor

Behind the scenes
In the "Anyone Can Host" episode—for which a contest found a non-celebrity to host the show—the musical guest, Elvis Costello, halted his band, the Attractions, seven seconds into the song "Less Than Zero", launching into "Radio Radio", an as-yet unreleased song critical of mainstream broadcasting. (The Sex Pistols were originally booked to appear on the show, but were denied visas to enter America). The change angered Lorne Michaels, and Costello would not be invited back to the show until 1989.

Chevy Chase hosted during the season, making him the first cast member to host after leaving the show. 
Right before the curtain call, a heated argument broke out backstage between Chase and relatively new cast member Bill Murray. After several insults were exchanged (including Chase mocking Murray's acne-scarred skin and Murray calling Chase a "medium talent"), the two men struck each other. Although by most accounts the altercation had been at least partially instigated by John Belushi, he was the one (along with Dan Aykroyd) who separated Murray and Chase moments before the entire cast regrouped in front of the live cameras. Before being banned from hosting altogether in 1997, Chase hosted the show several times throughout its history, though he was extremely unpopular with the cast and crew and regularly disagreed with them.

Writers

Tom Davis and Al Franken got prominent amounts of screen time. Brian Doyle-Murray and Don Novello joined the writing staff. Michael O'Donoghue temporarily left the show.

This season's writers were Dan Aykroyd, Anne Beatts, Tom Davis, Jim Downey, Brian Doyle-Murray, Al Franken, Neil Levy, Lorne Michaels, Marilyn Suzanne Miller, Don Novello, Michael O'Donoghue, Herb Sargent, Tom Schiller, Rosie Schuster and Alan Zweibel. The head writer, like the previous season, was Michael O'Donoghue.

Episodes

Home media
Season 3 was released on DVD May 13, 2008.

References

03
Saturday Night Live in the 1970s
1977 American television seasons
1978 American television seasons